"Sailing the Seas Depends on the Helmsman", sometimes known as "The Helmsman Sets the Ocean Course",  is the English-language title of a popular Chinese revolutionary song which was written by Wang Shuangyin in 1964. This song was commonly sung by the public, especially Red Guards during the Cultural Revolution (1966–1976) in praise of Mao Zedong Thought and the Communist Party. Like many revolutionary songs, the single verse of Sailing the Seas Depends on the Helmsman was most often sung repeatedly.

See also
 "Ode to the Motherland"
 "The East Is Red"
 "Without the Communist Party, There Would Be No New China"

References

Cultural Revolution
Propaganda in China
Maoist China propaganda songs